Rectal plexus may refer to:
 superior rectal plexus
 middle rectal plexus
 inferior rectal plexus